A bomboniera (Italian pronunciation: |bombo'njε:ra]), plural "bomboniere", (Italian, from French bonbonnière, a box containing "bonbons") is a kind of fragrant-smelling party favor given out on special occasions such as weddings, baptism, First Communion or Confirmation. It usually consists of five Jordan almonds in a festive bag, with the almonds symbolizing health, wealth, happiness, fertility and long life.  It is customary to inhale from it upon entering a guest's home.

The bag is typically made of tulle or satin and tied with ribbons. The almonds are white for a wedding, First Communion or Confirmation; pink or light-blue for the birthday or baptism of a girl or boy; red for a graduation; and silver or gold for 25 or 50 year anniversaries. Often they are adorned with dried natural flowers or artificial flowers made of silk or paper. The bag is often given stored inside a small vessel made of silver, crystal or porcelain.

In Australia, a bomboniere is party favor given out at weddings, first holy communions and the like. Such gifts may take the form of a wine bottle stopper, glass vase or picture frame as well as the more traditional sugared almonds in decorative bags.

Torta Bomboniera

Another type of bomboniera is the Favor Cake or "Torta Bomboniera" as it is called in Italy. It is made using little carton boxes forming one or more tiers of a "cake". Inside each box are sugared almonds and a card printed with the data of ceremony (names, date etc.). On each box is glued one of several types of fine objects made of many materials.

Some samples are below, for various ceremonies:

Another type is made using porcelain boxes shaped and hand decorated like an edible bignè or cream puff. Inside each box there are five sugared almonds and a card printed with the date of the ceremony. Italians call this type the "Pasticceria Artigianale in Porcellana" (Porcelain Artisan Pastries).

References

Confectionery